Jodhpur Park Boys School, also known as JPBS,  is a government-sponsored higher secondary school in the state of West Bengal, India. The school offers education in Bengali medium with English as the second language. Other subjects are taught as per the norms of the  West Bengal Board of Secondary Education, the West Bengal Council of Higher Secondary Education.

Head Masters
1961-1963: Sri P. K. Sen
1963-1986: Sri Dhirendra Nath Bhattacharyya
1986-2003: Sri Rabindra Nath Som
2003-2004: Dr. Subhendu Bhattacharya
2004-2017: Dr. Gopal Chandra Nandy
2017-2019: Dr. Sankar Praswad Ghosh
2019—Current:  Amit Sen Majumder

Uniform

General uniform: White half or full sleeve shirts with the school monogram. Dark grey trousers, white socks and black leather shoes.
Physical education dress: White shirts with the school monogram. White shorts, white socks and white shoes.
For winter:Navy blue sweater, navy blue scarf.

Notable alumni
 Srikanta Acharya, Singer.
 Tejendra Narayan Majumdar, Sarod Player.
 Prabuddha Raha, Singer.
 Amitava Bhattacharyya, Ranjit Trophy Player.
 Manabendra Mukherjee, Politician and Ex-Minister of Bengal.

References

External links
Jodhpur Park Boys School official website

Boys' schools in India
Primary schools in West Bengal
High schools and secondary schools in West Bengal
Schools in Kolkata
Educational institutions established in 1961
1961 establishments in West Bengal